Sunrise Movement is an American 501(c)(4) political action organization that advocates political action on climate change. When launched in 2017, the movement's goal was to elect proponents of renewable energy in the 2018 midterm elections, first in the Democratic primaries and then in the general election held on November 6, 2018. Since the midterm elections, the movement has been working towards shifting the Overton window on climate policy to center the environmental program known as the Green New Deal.

Together with Justice Democrats and Alexandria Ocasio-Cortez, the group organized a sit-in in the office of Speaker of the House Nancy Pelosi, which brought Sunrise its first significant press coverage. Sunrise organized a similar event in February 2019, bringing a group of young people to confront Senator Dianne Feinstein in her office.

Since the sit-in, the movement has been attracting media attention with their direct actions, such as the Wide Awake series of actions in the summer of 2020.

History

In the summer of 2013, Evan Weber, Matthew Lichtash, and environmentalist Michael K. Dorsey used a $30,000 grant plus free office space provided by the Sierra Club and the Wesleyan University Green Fund to draft an ambitious plan for climate action, which was the basis for the incorporation of the US Climate Plan 501(c)(3) nonprofit (aka Sunrise Movement Education Fund) incorporated in January 2014.

Sara Blazevic and Varshini Prakash started the Sunrise Movement on the East Coast in 2015. Blazevic, Prakash, and other early leaders trained at Momentum, an organization that teaches community organizing.

The Sunrise Movement launched as a 501(c)(4) in 2017. During the 2018 midterms, they worked to oust candidates who would not refuse funding from the fossil fuel industry and to elect proponents of renewable energy. Half of the group's first 20 endorsements won their elections. Deb Haaland, Alexandria Ocasio-Cortez, Rashida Tlaib, and Ilhan Omar won election to the House of Representatives—and six other endorsed candidates won election to state House or Senate seats in Florida, New York, and Pennsylvania.

Since the 2018 elections, the Sunrise Movement has focused on the climate change proposals collectively known as the Green New Deal, whose core principles have been described as "decarbonization, jobs, and justice". Its proposals include a transition to renewable energy, expanded public transportation, and an economic plan to drive job growth. Several publications have reported that the Green New Deal opposes nuclear power and carbon capture as well as some other technologies. However, Senator Ed Markey, the co-sponsor of the Green New Deal resolution in the United States Senate, stated that the resolution's language is technology-agnostic and does not exclude nuclear power or carbon capture.

In March 2019, a group of activists in the UK called on the Labour Party to commit to taking radical steps to decarbonize the UK economy within a decade. Calling their movement "Labour for a Green New Deal", a group spokesperson said they got their inspiration from the Sunrise Movement and the work that Ocasio-Cortez has done in the US. Group members have met with Zack Exley, co-founder of the progressive group Justice Democrats, to learn from the experiences that he and Ocasio-Cortez have had in working for the Green New Deal campaign in the US.

In the summer of 2020, the Sunrise Movement has started to do Wide Awake actions, in which movement members show up at politicians' houses early in the morning, chanting and making noise to wake them up.

Among controversies, the Washington, D.C. chapter of the movement has been accused of antisemitism after canceling a planned appearance over the simultaneous appearance and participation of several prominent Jewish organizations who they claim support Israeli Zionism: "Given our commitment to racial justice, self-governance, and indigenous sovereignty, we oppose Zionism and any state that enforces its ideology," the chapter stated. The national movement subsequently denounced the D.C. chapter's decision as "unacceptable and antisemitic" because it singled out Jewish groups without mentioning other participating groups with similar views on Zionism and Israel.

In a Noam Chomsky interview in April 2021, Chomsky was asked what in over 60 years of speaking he was most proud of. Mentioning the Sunrise Movement specifically, he replied: "The most gratifying thing is the work of the Sunrise Movement and many others who are carrying things forward in the face of severe difficulties, unflinching and moving forward on crucial challenges—that's gratifying."

The Sunrise Movement Education Fund, which is the Sunrise Movement's 501(c)(3) nonprofit, was recommended as a top climate change charity by Giving Green, a nonprofit charity assessment organization, in November 2020. Giving Green removed its recommendation in November 2021 because the Sunrise Movement Education Fund has more funding than it used to and because of uncertainty on the Sunrise Movement's future plans.

Activities

November 2018 sit-in
After taking control of the House of Representatives in the 2018 midterm elections, Democrats disagreed about the best way to address climate change with legislation. Sunrise planned a sit-in in Pelosi's office and asked Representative-elect Alexandria Ocasio-Cortez to help them publicize the event, which she instead decided to join herself. The sit-in demands were that all members of the Democratic leadership in the House would refuse donations from the fossil fuel industry, and that Pelosi work to build consensus in the House over Green New Deal legislation to be passed when Democrats regain control of government. The latter would be accomplished by a "Committee on a Green New Deal".
The sit-in took place on November 13. Over 250 protesters showed up to occupy Pelosi's office, with 51 being arrested by Capitol Police. Representative Rashida Tlaib voiced support for the protest over social media. Speaker Pelosi responded by welcoming the protest over Twitter, offering to reinstate the Committee on the Climate Crisis and noting that the already-promised infrastructure bill could address many of the Sunrise Movement's concerns.

Green New Deal Committee

One major goal has been to create a select committee on the Green New Deal, a plan opposed by some in the Democratic House leadership.

The Sunrise Movement continued to campaign for House members to sign onto the plan to create a select committee for the Green New Deal, as opposed to simply resurrecting the old committee. On December 10, they staged a second sit-in at the offices of Nancy Pelosi and Jim McGovern. Over 1000 protesters showed up. By December 19, 40 members of Congress had signed on to support the creation of the committee.

Instead, Speaker Pelosi and Majority Leader Steny Hoyer decided to recreate the Committee on the Climate Crisis, appointing Representative Kathy Castor as chair.

Meeting with Senator Feinstein

In February 2019, several San Francisco Bay Area children along with their adult sponsors met with Senator Dianne Feinstein to urge her to vote to support Green New Deal legislation. Feinstein told the children that she is working on an alternative bill, and that she could not support the proposed legislation which she believes is "unworkable" and has no chance of passing the Republican-controlled Senate. However, she allowed that she might vote for it as a symbolic gesture. The Sunrise Movement shared a video of the interaction, shortened so that it "focused on clips of the most tense moments" via social media and on its website. The shortened version has been viewed more than three million times. Sunrise also later posted the longer, unedited video on Facebook, resulting in controversy over whether the short version emphasized scenes intended to make Feinstein appear less sympathetic to the viewer. Senator Feinstein characterized the discussion as "spirited", while the executive director of the Sunrise movement said that Feinstein's treatment of the students was evidence that the Democratic Party required "fundamental change".

Road to a Green New Deal Tour 
In April 2019, the Sunrise Movement held their Road to a Green New Deal Tour. The tour was intended to garner support for the Green New Deal resolution, introduced in Congress by Representative Alexandria Ocasio-Cortez and Senator Ed Markey in February 2019. The tour spanned 8 cities and over 200 town halls, featuring local politicians, activists, and leading figures in the climate movement speaking about the importance of a Green New Deal and how to achieve it. The Road to a Green New Deal Tour kicked off in Boston with the lineup of speakers including Senator Ed Markey, Representative Ayanna Pressley, Sunrise co-founder Varshini Prakash, Reverend Mariama White-Hammond, and more leaders from the community speaking at the Strand Theater in Dorchester. It concluded in Washington, DC, at Howard University. Speakers included Senator Bernie Sanders, Representative Alexandria Ocasio-Cortez, journalist Naomi Klein, and Justice Democrats co-founder Alex Rojas.

Climate change debate campaign 

In early 2019, the Sunrise Movement defined one of its major goals as pressuring the Democratic National Committee (DNC) to hold a single-issue presidential debate on climate change. The DNC currently bars candidates from participating in outside debates (defined as multiple candidates on stage interacting with each other) but has no policy regarding participation in outside forums and town halls.

On June 26, 2019, Sunrise Movement activists slept on the steps of the DNC office in Washington, DC, to protest the lack of focus of the Democratic primary debates on the climate crisis, and to call for a focused debate on climate change. On July 25, CNN and MSNBC announced they would be hosting a climate change Town Hall and Forum, respectively. On August 22, the DNC Resolutions Committee voted 8–17 against hosting a DNC presidential climate change debate. During the session, a resolution was passed to allow multiple candidates to appear on a stage together at a climate change town hall or forum. However, in the breakout session on August 24, the resolution was voted down 222–137, with the DNC chair voting no.

Wide Awake campaign 
In the summer of 2020, the Sunrise Movement began performing Wide Awake demonstrations, in which a group of protestors would gather outside a politician's house and make noise early in the morning. The movement was inspired by the 1860 Wide Awakes, and is in protest of issues including police brutality and climate change. Politicians who have been "woken up" during these demonstrations include Mitch McConnell, Ted Cruz, Larry Hogan, Bill Barr, and Betsy DeVos.

Climate Mandate campaign 
In late 2020, the Sunrise Movement began their Climate Mandate campaign by putting pressure on Joe Biden to pick a "climate cabinet" that would work towards Sunrise's goals such as the Green New Deal, and pushing for Biden to establish the "Office of Climate Mobilization".

Organizational structure

National organization 
The national organization of the Sunrise Movement functions as the guiding force of the movement. Sunrise National sets campaigns, priorities, and makes their own endorsements.

The National organization has 4 main divisions:

 Organizing Division – responsible for building people power to achieve Sunrise's goals and implement strategy.
 Communications Division – responsible for all external and internal communications.
 Partnerships & Political Division – works with politicians and other institutional figures to achieve the political goals of the movement.
 Operations Division – responsible for maintaining the infrastructure of the movement.

The national organization recently created a 'Movement Leaders Portal' to centralize information. Sunrise members across the country can log in to this portal to access movement documents, strategy, and an events calendar.

Local work 
The Sunrise Movement is organized into decentralized "hubs" that operate in cities and towns across the United States. While the National organization is the main public-facing front of the organization, there are over 400 hubs spread over all 50 states that conduct their own actions, endorsements, and more. Hubs typically follow the campaigns set by the National team, such as the Wide Awake actions conducted over the summer of 2020, but also have the authority to decide their own structure and actions. This falls in line with Sunrise Principle 7: We Take Initiative, which states that any group of 3 can take action in the name of Sunrise. In the past, hub actions have included participating in climate strikes, making their own endorsements, and staging direct actions.

Movement houses 
Members of Sunrise have created "movement houses", which are shared living spaces where activists work and live together. These houses have appeared in Philadelphia, Washington, DC, Michigan, and more cities across the country.

Policy positions

Nuclear energy
The Movement opposes closing down existing nuclear power plants.

See also 
 Brand New Congress
 Citizens' Climate Lobby
 Extinction Rebellion
 Green New Deal
 Justice Democrats
 People's Climate March (2017)
 Project Hot Seat
 School strike for climate

Notes

References

External links 

 Official website

2017 establishments in Washington, D.C.
Advocacy groups in the United States
Climate change organizations based in the United States
Politics of climate change
Low-carbon economy
Political movements
Progressive International